Ysatis is a women's perfume produced by French fashion house Givenchy introduced in 1984. Xeryus, a matching fragrance for men, was introduced in 1986.

References

External links
 Ysatis at Basenotes.net

Products introduced in 1984
20th-century perfumes
Designer perfumes